Robert Frederick Elms (born 12 June 1959) is an English writer and broadcaster. Elms was a writer for The Face magazine in the 1980s and is currently known for his long-running radio show on BBC Radio London. His book, The Way We Wore, charts the changing fashions of his own youth, linking them with the social history of the times.

Early life and education
Elms was born in Hendon and educated at Orange Hill Grammar School for Boys, a state grammar school in the north-west London suburb of Burnt Oak, after passing the 11-plus examination for state school pupils. From there, Elms studied at the London School of Economics (LSE) in Central London.

Life and career
While still at the LSE, Elms became deeply involved in the "club scene" that was developing in London suburbs. He became a columnist for both The Face and NME, writing on both music and fashion. According to Elms, he was "almost a member" of the band Spandau Ballet. He championed them, having suggested their name, and introduced the group at early concerts by declaiming a brief verse. Band member Gary Kemp later commented that Elms was their "spin doctor", and said he "inspired" songs such as "Chant No. 1 (I Don't Need This Pressure On)", a number 3 UK Singles Chart hit for the band in 1981. Elms also worked as a DJ at clubs including the Palladium in New York.

Elms was a chronicler of the New Romantic movement of the early 1980s, which saw him become a popular interview choice for the broadcast media. Elms then developed a broadcasting career of his own, working in both radio and television. He was a contributor to Loose Ends (BBC Radio 4) and presented the Channel 4 travel series Travelog during the 1990s. In 1989, his first novel, In Search of the Crack was published by Penguin Books.

He served as a patron for the Arts Council's Architecture Week, until the demise of the event in 2007.

Since 1994, Elms has presented a long-running radio show on BBC Radio London, in 1999 being referred to as "its top presenter". The show features reports, discussions, and call-ins about Greater London, the history, architecture, geography, city planning and the language of London: in short, the minutiae of the city. Guests who are acknowledged experts in their fields of study appear on a regular basis, including architect Maxwell Hutchinson and film critic Jason Solomons. An extract of the shows is published as a podcast every week. Solomons often covers for Elms when he is on holiday.

Elms is a critic of The Beatles, and refuses to play the band on his BBC London daily radio show. He has been quoted as saying "I just think they are either childlike and simple or rather leaden and pompous – one or the other all the time. For me they turned something that was once sexy and raw and had roots, into something that was totally soulless, playground sing-along music. I think everything that is over-inflated deserves a pin-prick in it occasionally. How can they be above criticism? That's ludicrous."

His memoir, London Made Us, was published in 2019.

Personal life
In the 1980s, Elms squatted with singer Sade Adu in Tottenham. 

He is married to Christina Wilson and has three children: Alice, Alfie and Maude. The family lived in Camden, an area of London he promotes and where he has renovated a Georgian house. Elms is a Queens Park Rangers F.C. fan.

In 2021, Elms and his wife moved from their home in Camden to a flat at the Barbican Estate, Central London.

Bibliography
 In Search of the Crack, Penguin Books Ltd, 1989, 
 Spain – A Portrait After The General, William Heinemann Ltd, 1992, 
 The Way We Wore: A Life in Threads, Picador, 2006, 
 London Made Us, Canongate Books, 2019,

References

External links
 Robert Elms (BBC Radio London)
 Robert Elms podcast from BBC
 

1959 births
Living people
People from Hendon
English male non-fiction writers
English non-fiction writers
English radio personalities
English television personalities
20th-century squatters
Alumni of the London School of Economics
20th-century English novelists